Lucky is a 2013 studio album by Towa Tei. It peaked at number 36 on the Oricon Albums Chart. The cover art was painted by Yayoi Kusama.

Track listing

Charts

References

External links
 

2013 albums
Towa Tei albums
Warner Music Japan albums